Noah Caleb Crawford (born October 13, 1994) is an American actor and singer. He is best known as Nelson Baxter from his time in the Nickelodeon sitcom How to Rock, as well as portraying Young Earl Hickey in My Name Is Earl.

Life and career
Crawford was born in Oklahoma City, Oklahoma to Rich (who commutes between Oklahoma and California while running a pet sales business) and Jennifer Crawford. He has 3 younger sisters: Hannah, Oliviah and Bellah, and an older sister Lindsey who lives in Norman, Oklahoma with her husband Josh and daughter Lucca. He started acting lessons in Oklahoma when he was only 5 years old.

From 2005 to 2009, he appeared as Young Earl in the sitcom My Name Is Earl, for which he earned a Young Artist Award nomination in 2007. Shortly after he did the voice work for James Rogers (the son of Captain America and The Black Widow) in the direct-to-DVD film Next Avengers: Heroes of Tomorrow. In addition, he has guest starred in the television series Pair of Kings and True Jackson, VP. In 2012, Crawford co-starred as Nelson Baxter in the Nickelodeon sitcom How to Rock, which was produced for one season.

Filmography

Awards and nominations

References

External links
 
 

1994 births
American male child actors
American male film actors
American male television actors
Living people
Male actors from Oklahoma City
Musicians from Oklahoma City
21st-century American singers
21st-century American male singers